Nedumudi is a village in the Alappuzha district of the Indian state of Kerala. It is the birthplace of Malayalam actor Nedumudi Venu. Nedumudi sits on the banks of the river Pamba. It was the first village in Kerala to attain 100% Literacy.

Climate

Nedumudi is part of the lower Kuttanadu. It experiences a moderate climate, though in autumn, the Pamba river overflows and creates trouble. This flooding makes the soil rich for agriculture, the main economic occupation in Nedumudi. But in 2010, due to the unexpected climate change, the chance of another agricultural season is getting impossible.

The main celebration in the village is the annual festival of the Sree Bhagavathy temple, Kottaram. It is situated in Attuvathala. The festival is conducted by the four karas (sub divisions) of Nedumudi and the temple Devaswom.

Demographics

According to the 2001 Census of India, Nedumudi had a population of 15,428 with 7,525 males and 7,903 females.
The Nedumudi village is geographically divided into 4 sectors namely,
1) Attuvathala
2) Thottuvathala
3) Thekkemuri
4) Ponga

References

Villages in Alappuzha district